Daniel Carlos Silva Anjos (born 23 November 1979), sometimes known as Daniel Pitbull or just Daniel, is a Brazilian football player.

Club statistics

External links

Kawasaki Frontale

1979 births
Living people
Brazilian footballers
Brazilian expatriate footballers
Expatriate footballers in Japan
Expatriate footballers in Portugal
Primeira Liga players
Association football midfielders
J2 League players
Kawasaki Frontale players